Reg Plummer (29 December 1888 – 18 June 1953) was a Welsh international, rugby union wing who played club rugby for Newport and invitational rugby with both the Barbarians and Crawshays RFC. He won five caps for Wales and was selected for the British Lions 1910 tour of South Africa, though he did not play in any of the test games.

Rugby career
Plummer first played for Newport in 1905 at the age of 17 and spent almost the entirety of his career with the club. He captained Newport during the 1920/21 season and was part of the team that faced three touring sides; the 1906 and 1912 South Africans and the 1910 Australians.

Plummer was first capped for Wales on 3 February 1912 when he played against Scotland at St Helens under the captaincy of Dicky Owen. It was an excellent game from a Welsh viewpoint as the team beat Scotland 21-6, and Plummer himself scored a try. During the same campaign he scored a second international try, this time against France at Rodney Parade. Plummer was later selected against the touring South African team, as he done so for Newport two months earlier.

International matches played
Wales
  1913
  1912
  1912
  1912
  1912

Bibliography

References

1888 births
1953 deaths
Barbarian F.C. players
British & Irish Lions rugby union players from Wales
Crawshays RFC players
London Welsh RFC players
Newport RFC players
Rugby union players from Newport, Wales
Rugby union wings
Wales international rugby union players
Welsh rugby union players